Louisiana's 9th State Senate district is one of 39 districts in the Louisiana State Senate. It has been represented by Republican Cameron Henry since 2020, succeeding fellow Republican Conrad Appel.

Geography
District 9 is based in the Jefferson Parish city of Metairie, also incorporating smaller parts of Jefferson and Uptown New Orleans.

The district overlaps with Louisiana's 1st and 2nd congressional districts, and with the 79th, 80th, 82nd, 94th, and 98th districts of the Louisiana House of Representatives.

Recent election results
Louisiana uses a jungle primary system. If no candidate receives 50% in the first round of voting, when all candidates appear on the same ballot regardless of party, the top-two finishers advance to a runoff election.

2019

2015

2011

Federal and statewide results in District 9

References

Louisiana State Senate districts
Jefferson Parish, Louisiana
Orleans Parish, Louisiana